Haydock railway station served the village of Haydock, formerly in Lancashire, now in Merseyside, England.

The station was on the Liverpool, St Helens and South Lancashire Railway line from Lowton St Mary's to the original St Helens Central railway station where it was crossed by what is now the A599 in the centre of the village.

East of the station was the  Haydock Colliery Tunnel, the only tunnel on the line. It was built at the railway's expense using the 'cut and cover' method. Its sole purpose was to burrow beneath Haydock Colliery's tracks.

History
Opened by the Liverpool, St Helens and South Lancashire Railway, as part of the Great Central Railway, it became part of the London and North Eastern Railway during the Grouping of 1923. The line and station passed to the Eastern Region of British Railways on nationalisation in 1948, being transferred to the London Midland Region later that year.

The line through the station was originally double track and the station had two platforms. In the 1930s the down (St Helens-bound) track was changed into a long siding and all trains to and from St Helens used the up line. The station's down side shelter and signs were removed.

Services
In 1922 five "down" (towards St Helens) trains called at the station, Mondays to Saturdays. These called at all stations from Manchester Central to St Helens via Glazebrook and Culcheth. The "up" service was similar.

By 1948 four trains plied between St Helens Central and Manchester Central, calling at all stations, Monday to Friday, reduced to three on Saturdays.

A fuller selection of public and working timetables has now been published. Among other things this suggests that Sunday services ran until 1914, but had ceased by 1922 never to return.

Closure
The station was closed to passenger traffic by the British Railways Board in 1952, though goods traffic through to St Helens lingered on until 1965, when the tracks west of Ashton-in-Makerfield were abandoned. A short stretch from Ashton through the Haydock station site to a new Shell distribution depot was reinstated in 1968. This ceased being rail-served in 1983, whereafter the line was cut back to Lowton Metals' scrapyard at Ashton. Tracks were eventually lifted.

The site today

By 2003 modern housing had obliterated the station site.

References

Sources

External links
 The station in Disused Stations UK
 The station on an 1888-1913 Overlay OS Map in National Library of Scotland
 The station on a 1948 OS Map in npe Maps
 The station and line overlain on many maps in Rail Map Online
 Station and line HOB3 in Railway Codes

Former Great Central Railway stations
Railway stations in Great Britain opened in 1900
Railway stations in Great Britain closed in 1952
Disused railway stations in St Helens, Merseyside